Prasannbhai Mehta (born 6 February 1923) is an Indian politician. He was elected to the Lok Sabha, lower house of the Parliament of India from Bhavnagar in Gujarat as a member of the Janata Party.

References

External links
 Official biographical sketch in Parliament of India website

1923 births
Possibly living people
India MPs 1967–1970
India MPs 1971–1977
India MPs 1977–1979
Lok Sabha members from Gujarat